Drew Paris (born May 12, 1988) is a Canadian professional ice hockey defenceman. He is currently playing for LNAH side Saint-Georges Cool FM 103.5.

Playing career
Prior to turning professional with the Rochester Americans, Paris played major junior hockey in the Quebec Major Junior Hockey League.

After splitting the 2011-12 season, between the Chicago Express of the ECHL and the Toronto Marlies of the AHL, Paris signed a one-year contract with European team, Düsseldorfer EG, of the DEL.

On June 21, 2016, after a successful 2015–16 season in Sweden with Tingsryds AIF of the second tier HockeyAllsvenskan, Paris opted to remain in Sweden, signing with newly demoted Allsvenskan club, Modo Hockey on a one-year deal.

After a spell with Dornbirner EC, Paris moved to the UK to sign for EIHL side Cardiff Devils in June 2017.

Paris has since spent time with Swedish side Karlskrona HK and in Canada with Saint-Georges Cool FM 103.5.

Career statistics

Awards and honours

References

External links

1988 births
Living people
Acadie–Bathurst Titan players
Black Canadian ice hockey players
Canadian ice hockey defencemen
Cardiff Devils players
Chicago Express players
Chicoutimi Saguenéens (QMJHL) players
Drummondville Voltigeurs players
Düsseldorfer EG players
Dornbirn Bulldogs players
Elmira Jackals (ECHL) players
Florida Everblades players
Gwinnett Gladiators players
Ice hockey people from Quebec
Karlskrona HK players
Modo Hockey players
Quebec Remparts players
Rimouski Océanic players
Rochester Americans players
Saint-Georges Cool FM 103.5 players
Tingsryds AIF players
Toronto Marlies players
Canadian expatriate ice hockey players in Austria
Canadian expatriate ice hockey players in Wales
Canadian expatriate ice hockey players in Germany
Canadian expatriate ice hockey players in Sweden
Canadian expatriate ice hockey players in the United States